Kika is a rural locality (a village) in Oktyabrskoye Rural Settlement, Vyaznikovsky District, Vladimir Oblast, Russia. The population was 29 as of 2010.

Geography 
Kika is located 10 km west of Vyazniki (the district's administrative centre) by road. Senkovo is the nearest rural locality.

References 

Rural localities in Vyaznikovsky District